The Lindy Hop is an American dance which was born in the Black communities of Harlem, New York City, in 1928 and has evolved since then. It was very popular during the swing era of the late 1930s and early 1940s. Lindy is a fusion of many dances that preceded it or were popular during its development but is mainly based on jazz, tap, breakaway, and Charleston. It is frequently described as a jazz dance and is a member of the swing dance family.

In its development, the Lindy Hop combined elements of both partnered and solo dancing by using the movements and improvisation of African-American dances along with the formal eight-count structure of European partner dances – most clearly illustrated in the Lindy's basic step, the swingout. In this step's open position, each dancer is generally connected hand-to-hand; in its closed position, leads and follows are connected as though in an embrace on one side and holding hands on the other.

There was renewed interest in the dance in the 1980s from American, Swedish, and British dancers and the Lindy Hop is now represented by dancers and loosely affiliated grass-roots organizations in North America, South America, Europe, Asia, and Oceania.

Lindy Hop today is danced as a social dance, as a competitive dance, as a performance dance, and in classes, workshops, and camps. Partners may dance alone or together, with improvisation a central part of social dancing and many performance and competition pieces.

Lindy Hop is sometimes referred to as a street dance, referring to its improvisational and social nature. In 1932, twelve-year-old Norma Miller did the Lindy Hop outside the Savoy Ballroom with her friends for tips.  In 1935, 15,000 people danced on Bradhurst Avenue for the second of a dance series held by the Parks Department. Between 147th and 148th street, Harlem "threw itself into the Lindy hop with abandon" as Sugar Hill residents watched from the bluffs along Edgecombe Avenue.

History

From jazz to swing (1920s–1940s)

The first dances named as Lindy Hop were born around the time the aviator Charles Lindbergh made his groundbreaking flight across the Atlantic Ocean in May 1927. The most famous Lindy Hop dance, which is not connected to the other Lindy Hop dances, was born in the Harlem dance marathon in 1928 where George Snowden and Mattie Purnell reinvented the breakaway pattern by accident. That started a process in which their invention became bigger than it initially suggested. Obviously, the Harlem dance is the only one of the Lindy Hop dances which survived in the long run.

The Harlem Lindy Hop developed probably from four possible sources, or some combination thereof: the breakaway, the Charleston, the Texas Tommy, and the hop.

A recorded source of the non-Harlem-connected Lindy Hop dances is the famed aviator Charles Lindbergh, nicknamed "Lucky Lindy", who "hopped the Atlantic" in 1927. After Lindbergh's solo non-stop flight from New York to Paris in 1927 he became incredibly popular and many people named songs, recipes and businesses among several other things, after him. Te Roy Williams and His Orchestra recorded the song "Lindbergh Hop", written by Ted Nixon and Elmer Snowden, on May 25, 1927. The Memphis Jug Band on September 13, 1928 recorded "Lindberg Hop- Overseas stomp," written by Jab Jones and Will Shade.

The first of the Lindy Hop-named dances was probably the "Lindbergh Hop" which was referred to as ‘ Lindy "Hop"  in the headline of an article in Pittsburgh Gazette Times on May 25, 1927,  just four days after Lindbergh landed at Le Bourget. The dance was reported to be Broadway's tribute to Lindbergh, and it included six basic steps.

Later, a "Lindy Hop" dance was described  by  columnist Gilbert Swan. He wrote, "Obviously the first dance named for the Lindbergh flight was the 'Lindy Hop'...Like all trick dances, they will be done in a few theatres and dance halls, where experts appear, and that will be that". Later that year, on September 14, the Woodland Daily Democrat reported Catherine B. Sullivan describing the  "Lindy Hop" as having been placed third in the Dancing Masters of America, New Dances competition, behind the Kikajou and the Dixie Step. (The "Lindy Hop" was also described  in reports as the "Lindbergh Glide"). The journalist reports that Miss Johnson showed a very fast  little step, with hops and a kick, whilst holding the arms out, like the Spirit of St. Louis. The foot work is described as "dum-de-dum, dum-de-dum, dum-de-dum".

According to Ethel Williams, the Lindy Hop was similar to the dance known as the Texas Tommy in New York in 1913. The basic steps in the Texas Tommy were followed by a breakaway identical to that found in the Lindy. Savoy dancer "Shorty" George Snowden told Marshall Stearns in 1959 that "We used to call the basic step the Hop long before Lindbergh did his hop across the Atlantic. It had been around a long time and some people began to call it the Lindbergh Hop after 1927, although it didn't last. Then, during the marathon at Manhattan Casino, I got tired of the same old steps and cut loose with a breakaway..." According to Snowden, Fox Movietone News covered the marathon and took a close-up of Shorty's feet. As told to Marshall and Jean Stearns, he was asked "What are you doing with your feet," and replied, "The Lindy". The date was June 17, 1928.

Snowden's account to Stearns probably refers to the fact that he used already existing elements of the dance when he and his partner Mattie Purnell had an accident in the dance marathon where they became separated for a while until Snowden got back to Purnell. According to Snowden, the crowd in the dance marathon answered enthusiastically to the accident. As Marshall Stearns put it, Snowden rediscovered the Breakaway pattern when the accident happened. But the accident where Snowden and Purnell devised the basic principle of the Lindy Hop turned out to be much bigger than it initially suggested. Their invention started a process which led the Lindy Hop to contests, theaters and ballrooms by the end of 1928, and to Broadway plays by 1930. Thus, Snowden and Purnell are the creators of the Harlem Lindy Hop.

The first generation of Lindy Hop is popularly associated with dancers such as "Shorty" George Snowden, his partner Big Bea, and Leroy Stretch Jones and Little Bea. "Shorty" George and Big Bea regularly won contests at the Savoy Ballroom. Their dancing accentuated the difference in size with Big Bea towering over Shorty. These dancers specialized in so-called floor steps, but they also experimented with early versions of air steps in the Lindy Hop.

As white people began going to Harlem to watch black dancers, according to Langston Hughes:

Hughes's mocking statement reflects how the Harlem Renaissance movement acknowledged the Lindy Hop which the movement considered part of "low culture", and thus not an important cultural achievement. According to Snowden, "When he finally offered to pay us, we went up and had a ball. All we wanted to do was dance anyway." When by 1936 "Air steps" or "aerials" such as the Hip to Hip, Side Flip, and Over the Back (the names describe the motion of the follow in the air) began to appear, the old guard of dancers such as Leon James, Leroy Jones, and Shorty Snowden disapproved of the new moves.

Younger dancers fresh out of high school (Al Minns, Joe Daniels, Russell Williams, and Pepsi Bethel) worked out the Back Flip, "Over the head", and "the Snatch".

Frankie Manning was part of a new generation of Lindy Hoppers, and is the most celebrated Lindy Hopper in history. Al Minns and Pepsi Bethel, Leon James, and Norma Miller are also featured prominently in contemporary histories of Lindy Hop. Some sources credit Manning, working with his partner Freida Washington, for inventing the ground-breaking "Air Step" or "aerial" in 1935. One source credits Al Minns and Pepsi Bethel as among those who refined the air step. However, early versions of air steps in the Lindy Hop were performed already from the very beginning of the 1930s. An Air Step is a dance move in which at least one of the partners' two feet leave the ground in a dramatic, acrobatic style. Most importantly, it is done in time with the music. Air steps are now widely associated with the characterization of lindy hop, despite being generally reserved for competition or performance dancing, and not generally being executed on any social dance floor.

Lindy Hop entered mainstream American culture in the 1930s, gaining popularity through multiple sources. Dance troupes, including the Whitey's Lindy Hoppers (also known as the Harlem Congaroos), Hot Chocolates and Big Apple Dancers exhibited the Lindy Hop.  Hollywood films, such as Hellzapoppin' and A Day at the Races began featuring the Lindy Hop in dance sequences. Dance studios such as those of Arthur Murray  began teaching Lindy Hop. By the early 1940s the dance was known as "New Yorker" on the West Coast.

In 1944, due to continued involvement in World War II, the United States levied a 30 percent federal excise tax against "dancing" nightclubs. Although the tax was later reduced to 20 percent, "No Dancing Allowed" signs went up all over the country.

Post-swing era (1950s–1960s)
Arthur Murray's 1954 edition of How to Become a Good Dancer included four pages of instruction for swing, covering the basic Lindy step, the double Lindy Hop, the triple Lindy Hop, the sugar foot walk, and the tuck-in turn. A chapter is devoted to Lindy Hop in the 1953 and 1958 editions of Dancing Made Easy.

The 1962 Ballroom Dancebook for Teachers included an entire chapter on "Lindy".

According to the book Social Dance (copyrighted in 1969), by 1960 the Lindy Hop was known as "swing".

Revival (1980s and 1990s)

Sandra Cameron and Larry Schulz of the Cameron Dance Center Inc convinced Al Minns and Frankie Manning to teach Lindy Hop at their dance center. Minns joined the dance center and began a swing program there in 1981. Frankie Manning joined the Center in 1985.

Al Minns' early students formed the New York Swing Dance Society, established in 1985.

In the 1980s, American and European dancers from California, New York, London and Sweden (such as Sylvia Sykes in the United States and Stockholm's Hot Shots) went about "reviving" Lindy Hop using archival films such as Hellzapoppin' and A Day at the Races and by contacting dancers such as Frankie Manning, Al Minns, and Norma Miller. In the mid-to-late 1990s the popularity of neo swing music of the swing revival stimulated mainstream interest in the dance. The dance was propelled to wide visibility after it was featured in movies such as Swing Kids in 1993 and in the "Kakhis Swing" television commercials for Gap in 1998.

In 1999, Swing! opened up on Broadway, featuring world-class Lindy Hoppers Jenny Thomas and Ryan Francois, Latin swing dancer Maria Torres and her partner Carlos Sierra-Lopez, country swing stars Robert Royston and Laureen Baldovi, and west coast swing couple Beverly Durand and Aldrin Gonzales. Carol Bentley, Scott Fowler, Caitlin Carter, Edger Godineaux, Geralyn Del Corso, and Keith Lamelle Thomas were also featured in various swing-related dance pieces in the Tony-nominated show during its run at the St. James Theatre. The show closed in January 2001, yet continues to be set in regional and international cities around the world.

Hollywood-style Lindy Hop
Hollywood-style Lindy Hop is sometimes referred to as Dean Collins or Smooth-style, but these terms also sometimes refer to different styles of Lindy Hop.

Hollywood is the style reconstructed by Erik Robison and Sylvia Skylar based on movies from the 1930s and 1940s featuring dancers like Dean Collins, Jewel McGowan, Jean Veloz and others. They were the first to call it "Hollywood Style".

The swingout (the basic step of Lindy) is danced in a position often described as someone about to sit on a stool, thereby bringing their center point of balance closer to the ground.  This piked position is the classic look of Hollywood with the back straight and a slight forward tilt.  The Hollywood style is also a slotted dance, meaning the follower travels in a straight line instead of the more elliptical or circular Savoy-style Lindy Hop.

A popular variation of Hollywood-Style Lindy Hop called LA-style Lindy Hop has a few technical changes in the footwork and fewer steps. The steps are shortened or "cheated" to create this look. The style is geared towards performance and is heavily based on short choreographies. Originating in Los Angeles, LA-style is a favorite on the west coast of the United States. It is featured in a bravura number with Martha Raye in the 1941 film of Hellzapoppin'.

Savoy-style Lindy Hop
Savoy-style Lindy Hop was danced at the Savoy Ballroom in Harlem in the 1930s and 1940s. This contrasted with Hollywood-style Lindy Hop or "Smooth-Style Lindy Hop" popularly associated with Dean Collins and his Lindy Hop choreography in Hollywood films. Savoy-style is characterized by a high energy, circular, rotating style, in contrast with the smooth, slotted styling of Hollywood (Smooth).

The Savoy Ballroom was the end of the line for an ascending network of clubs, church socials, in New York and beyond. George Snowden, Frankie Manning and George Sullivan were all dismissed by prospective partners for having allegedly inadequate dance skills. With an unusually high preponderance of skilled social dancers there was an infinite variety of interpretations. As Frankie Manning put it, "Everyone at the Savoy had their [own] style." And there was no specific "Savoy style" of Lindy Hopping.

A more modern style of dance called "lindy hop" also occurs, characterized by slower music, more improvisation, and "groove" style. This usage evolved in San Francisco and Los Angeles in the late 90s to distinguish it from the "Hollywood" or "LA Style" that was becoming popular. The latter styles were typically done to faster music and with less room for improvisation, limited to what could be fit into existing patterns. The coinage was based on the erroneous idea that black dancers on the East Coast danced in a slow, "groovy" manner with much improvisation not fitting within the typical patterns. This usage seems to be diminishing in usage and the term is often used today to describe faster lindy hop based on moves from Whitey's Lindy Hoppers and other dancers from the Savoy ballroom. However, as most dancers of this style do not possess the years of ingrained African American movement possessed by these early dancers, it is difficult to replicate, and it might be said that most modern dancers more closely resemble Dean Collins and his West Coast contemporaries.

Savoy Ballroom dancers
Savoy style Lindy Hop was most frequently associated with living dancers from the 1930s such as Frankie Manning, and with the Swedish dance troupe The Rhythm Hot Shots (now replaced by the Harlem Hot Shots).

The term "Savoy-style Lindy Hop" applies a generic relationship between all African American Lindy Hoppers (and aficionados of their styles) which ignores the variety and diversity of Lindy Hop in the 1930s and 40s. Lindy Hop historians see clear differences between the Lindy Hop of the early years of its development (the late 1920s) and dancers such as "Shorty" George Snowden, dancers of the 1930s (such as Manning), and then between individual dancers during these periods. Lennart Westerlund – a key member of The Rhythm Hot Shots and authoritative Lindy Hop historian – described the differences in styles between Manning and Al Minns, the dancer he worked with in the earliest years of the Lindy Hop revival. Al Minns and Leon James are often considered authoritative figures in the academic discussion of Lindy Hop, in part for their work with Marshall Stearns and Jean Stearns (in their book Jazz Dance and documentary films). Lindy Hop historians also draw clear distinctions between the dancing styles of key female dancers such as Norma Miller and Ann Johnson. The most useful point to be made about this variation within a single community of dancers in one historical moment, is that vernacular African American dance, and Lindy Hop in particular, prioritised individual style and creative improvisation and musical interpretation within a particular dance style.

Features
In describing Savoy style Lindy Hop, observers note that the follower is led out of the basic Swingout sideways as a default. This is not the case, however, as leading a follow out backwards or forwards is just as likely. Savoy style is also said to be characterized by a pronounced downwards "bounce", which is again something of a misnomer, as different dancers employed varying degrees and types of "bounce", and observers of Frankie Manning have noted changes in his own dancing style in this respect over the years. Despite these comments, it is important to note that the "bounce" described is characteristic of many African American vernacular dance forms. One of the clearest distinctions between Hollywood and Smooth style Lindy Hop and Savoy style Lindy Hop is the open "connection" and relative freedom of the follower to improvise within the structure of the Swingout in particular. Again, this technical difference varies between individual dancers, and between teachers today. Historians may also note that Hollywood style, while often characterized by a more intense connection (characterized at its extreme by counter balance), also featured extensive variations and individual improvisation within the swingout in other instances.

African American identity
Perhaps the most useful employment of the term "Savoy-style Lindy Hop" lies in the association of the Savoy Ballroom (and dancers who were associated with it, particularly those of the Whitey's Lindy Hoppers) and ethnicity. Despite the differences noted above, there are marked tropes in African American and African dances which are present in the Lindy Hop of these dancers in this period. These may include:
 clear angles at the ankle – between leg and foot – and often at the wrist and/or elbow
 wide-legged stances for both women and men, particularly in the follower's swivel
 Frankie Manning's characteristically "athletic" stance – like a runner spread out in motion, parallel to the ground – echoes African dance
 particular "variations" or jazz steps associated with Savoy-style date back to the African communities from which African American slaves were taken (and are discussed in the History of slavery in the United States article), including the move "the itch" which then moved on to white communities and across to the west coast of America with dancers like Dean Collins.

Current status

There are lindy hop communities throughout the world.  The concept of a Lindy exchange, a gathering of Lindy Hop dancers in one city for several days to dance with visitors and locals, enables different communities to share their ideas with others. The first Lindy exchange was called "The Weekend", and occurred on December 4–6, 1998, in California, between the cities of Chicago, Illinois, and San Francisco, California.

Many annual lindy hop conventions are held across the world, such as Camp Hollywood in Los Angeles, International Lindy Hop Championships on the US east coast, and Rock That Swing Festival in München.

In 2016, a documentary film named Alive and Kicking was produced by Susan Glatzer. In 2022, Sw!ng Out, a swing dance performance choreographed by Caleb Teicher, started touring in the US.

References

Further reading
 Batchelor, Christian, This Thing Called Swing. Christian Batchelor Books, 1997, 
 DeFrantz, Thomas. Dancing Many Drums: Excavations in African American Dance. Wisconsin: University of Wisconsin Press, 2001.
 Emery, Lynne Fauley. Black Dance in the United States from 1619 to 1970. California: National Press Books, 1972.
 Friedland, LeeEllen. "Social Commentary in African-American Movement Performance." In Brenda Farnell (ed.), Human Action Signs in Cultural Context: The Visible and the Invisible in Movement and Dance. London: Scarecrow Press, 1995. 136 – 57.
 Giordano, Ralph G. Social Dancing in America: A History and Reference, Volume 2, Lindy Hop to Hip Hop, 1901–2000. Greenwood, 2006. 
 Gottschild, Brenda Dixon. Digging the Africanist Presence in American Performance. Connecticut and London: Greenwood Press, 1996.
 Hancock, Black Hawk. American Allegory: Lindy Hop and the Racial Imagination. Chicago: University of Chicago Press, 2013.
 Hazzard-Gordon, Katrina. Jookin': The Rise of Social Dance Formations in African-American Culture. Philadelphia: Temple University Press, 1990.
 Jackson, Jonathan David. "Improvisation in African-American Vernacular Dancing." Dance Research Journal 33.2 (2001/2002): 40 – 53.
 Malone, Jacqui. Steppin' on the Blues: The Visible Rhythms of African American Dance. Urbana and Chicago: University of Illinois Press, 1996.
 
 Stevens, Erin and Tamara. Swing Dancing. The American Dance Floor Series, Greenwood, 2011, 
 Szwed, John F., and Morton Marks. "The Afro-American Transformation of European Set Dances and Dance Suites." Dance Research Journal 20.1 (1988): 29 – 36.
Spring, Howard. "Swing and the Lindy Hop: Dance, Venue, Media, and Tradition". American Music, Vol. 15, No. 2 (Summer 1997), pp. 183–207.
 Thomas, Amy. Infinity Dance: The Move That Never Ends. California: National Press Books, 2006.

External links

"Savoystyle Archives of early Lindy Hop", resource for Lindy Hop history
"Lindy Hop Terms"
 "Lindy Hop and Retro Lifestyle"

 
Dancesport
Competitive dance
Swing dances
Dance terminology
Articles containing video clips
Social dance
Novelty and fad dances